Trithyris is a genus of moths of the family Crambidae.

Species
Trithyris aethiopicalis Ghesquière, 1942
Trithyris flavifimbria Dognin, 1905
Trithyris janualis Lederer, 1863

References

Natural History Museum Lepidoptera genus database

Pyraustinae
Crambidae genera
Taxa named by Julius Lederer